David Gallagher (born 5 August 1980) is an Australian rules footballer who has played in the Australian Football League and the Victorian Football League.

Gallagher was recruited from the Prahran Dragons in the TAC Cup to the Adelaide Football Club with the 32nd selection in the 1998 AFL Draft. After playing 26 games over three seasons, including an AFL Rising Star nomination in 1999 he was traded to Carlton in return for Ben Nelson. He played in seven of the first nine games of the 2002 season, but did not play again in the AFL and was delisted.

After his AFL career, Gallagher has had a long and successful Victorian Football League (VFL) career with the Sandringham Football Club, playing more than 150 games between 2003 and 2011. He won consecutive premierships with the club in 2004, 2005 and 2006, twice won the best and fairest award, in 2004 and 2009, and was made club captain in 2011. However, immediately prior to the 2012 season, he became frustrated with the nature of Sandringham's reserves affiliation with AFL team , and left the club. He returned to the VFL in 2013, signing with the Frankston Football Club.

References

Sources
 Lovett, M. (ed.) (2005) AFL 2005, Australian Football League: Melbourne. .

Adelaide Football Club players
Carlton Football Club players
Sandringham Football Club players
Prahran Dragons players
Frankston Football Club players
1980 births
Living people
Australian rules footballers from Victoria (Australia)
Australian people of Sri Lankan descent